Arna Sif Ásgrímsdóttir (born 12 August 1992) is an Icelandic footballer who plays as a defender for Icelandic club Þór/KA and the Iceland national team. She had previously played for Valur in Iceland and Kopparbergs/Göteborg FC in Sweden.

Club career
In 2011 Arna Sif became captain of Þór/KA and switched from playing in midfield to central defence. After guiding the club to their first ever Úrvalsdeild title in 2012, she was named Akureyri's Athlete of the Year. Arna Sif joined Swedish Damallsvenskan club Kopparbergs/Göteborg FC in February 2015, after impressing in a short trial period. At 22-years-old she had played for Þór/KA for the previous eight seasons.

In November 2015, she returned to play in the Úrvalsdeild when she sign a contract with Valur.

International career
Arna Sif made her senior debut for the Iceland national team in August 2014, playing in a 1–0 World Cup qualifying defeat by Denmark at Laugardalsvöllur in Reykjavík.

Honours 
Þór Akureyri
Winner
 Úrvalsdeild: 2012
 Icelandic Women's Super Cup: 2013

Runners-up
 Icelandic Women's Cup: 2013

References

External links 
 
 
  
 
 

1992 births
Living people
Icelandic women's footballers
Icelandic expatriate footballers
Iceland women's international footballers
Damallsvenskan players
BK Häcken FF players
Expatriate women's footballers in Sweden
Valur (women's football) players
Arna Ásgrímsdóttir
Women's association football central defenders
Þór/KA players
UEFA Women's Euro 2017 players